Thomas Burdett may refer to:
 Sir Thomas Burdett, 1st Baronet, of Bramcote (1585 – c. 1647), English sheriff and baronet
 Sir Thomas Burdett, 1st Baronet, of Dunmore (1668–1727), Irish politician and baronet
 Tommy Burdett (1915–2001), English footballer